Toto or Totò is a nickname which may refer to:

Anthony Toto, nickname of Antonio di Nunziato d'Antonio, (1498–1554), Italian painter and architect
 Totò, nickname of Antonio Di Natale (born 1977), Italian footballer
 Toto, nickname of Emmanuel Constant (born 1956), Haitian death squad founder
 Toto Bissainthe, nickname of Marie Clotilde Bissainthe, (1934–1994), Haitian actress and singer
 Toto Cornejo, nickname of Oscar Roberto Cornejo Hernandez, (born 1983), Argentine footballer
 Totò Cuffaro, nickname of Salvatore Cuffaro (born 1958), Italian politician
 Toto Cutugno, nickname of Salvatore Cutugno, (born 1943), Italian pop singer-songwriter
 Toto D'Aquila, nickname of Salvatore D'Aquila (1873–1928), New York City Mafia boss
 Toto Karaca, stagename of İrma Felegyan, (1912–1992), Turkish stage actress
 Toto Koopman, nickname of Catharina Koopman (1908–1991), Dutch-Javanese model 
 Toto Leonidas, nickname of Alfredo C. Leonidas (born 1960), professional poker player
 Toto Lorenzo, nickname of Juan Carlos Lorenzo (1922–2001), Argentine footballer and coach
 Toto Mangudadatu, nickname of Esmael Mangudadatu (born 1968), Filipino politician
 Totò Mignone, nickname of Ottone Mignone, (1906–1993), Italian dancer
 Toto Pongsawang, nickname of Chamlong Thamwiyot, (born c. 1968), Thai boxer and kickboxer
 Totò Riina, nickname of Salvatore Riina (1930–2017), Italian mobster
 Totò Savio, nickname of Gaetano Savio (1937–2004), Italian composer, lyricist, producer, guitarist, and occasional singer
 Totò Schillaci, nickname of Salvatore Schillaci (born 1964), Italian former footballer
 Toto Terry, nickname of Alberto Terry Arias-Schreiber (1929–2006), Peruvian footballer
 Toto Wolff, nickname of Torger Christian Wolff (born 1972), Austrian investor and racing car driver

See also

Tono (name)

Lists of people by nickname